Saint-Izaire  (Languedocien: Sent Esèri) is a commune in the Aveyron department in southern France.

The Château de Saint-Izaire is a 14th-century episcopal castle.

Geography
The commune is traversed by the Dourdou de Camarès River.

Population

See also
Communes of the Aveyron department

References

Communes of Aveyron
Aveyron communes articles needing translation from French Wikipedia